Prasocuris junci is a species of leaf beetle native to Europe.

References

External links
Images representing Prasocuris at BOLD

Chrysomelinae
Beetles described in 1790
Beetles of Europe